The Peoria Redwings was a women's professional baseball team who joined the All-American Girls Professional Baseball League in the 1946 season and remained in the league through 1951. The team represented Peoria, Illinois, playing home games at Peoria Stadium.

History
The Redwings made an unsteady start in their inaugural season, going 33–79 to finish last 41 games out of first place in the Western Division. The team improved in 1947 with a 54–57 record, good to finish in fifth place in the eight–team league.

Their most productive season came in 1948, when they finished 71–55 for third place in the division and fourth overall, gaining a playoff spot. In the playoffs, the Redwings were swept by the Racine Belles in three straight games.

Peoria fell to 36–43 and last place in 1949, and next–to–last in 1950 after ending 44–63–2. They went 48–56–2 in 1951, their last season, having finished over .500 once in six years of existence.

Some players of note included pitchers Doris Barr,  Dorothy Mueller and Mary Nesbitt; infielders Margaret Callaghan, Betty McKenna and Dorothy Stolze; outfielders Eleanor Callow and Thelma Eisen, and OF/P Mary Reynolds. Eventually, Eisen and Reynolds served as player/managers for the team.

All-time roster

Bold denotes members of the inaugural roster

Velma Abbott 
Doris Barr
Mary Baumgartner
Mary Lou Beschorner
Maybelle Blair
Kay Blumetta
Rita Briggs
Marian Bryson
Florence Bucior
Margaret Callaghan
Eleanor Callow 
Mary Carey
Jean Cione
Corinne Clark
Pauline Crawley
Mary Dailey 
Faye Dancer
Alice DeCambra
Mildred Deegan
Jerre DeNoble
Terry Donahue
Thelma Eisen
June Emerson
Lillian Faralla
Dorothy Ferguson
Helen Filarski
Mary Flaherty
Luisa Gallegos
Gertrude Ganote
Eilleen Gascon
Jeanne Gilchrist
Geraldine Guest
Audrey Haine   
Ann Harnett
Josephine Hasham
Beverly Hatzell
Joyce Hill
Barbara Hines
Nadine Hoffmann
Alice Hohlmayer
Jane Jacobs
Frances Janssen
Christine Jewitt
Josephine Kabick
Jacquelyn Kelley
Irene Kerwin
Erma Keyes
Glenna Sue Kidd
Phyllis Koehn
Mary Louise Kolanko
Jaynie Krick
Mary Lawson
Noella Leduc
Annabelle Lee
Josephine Lenard
Kay Lionikas
Frances Lovett
Mary McCarty
Helene Machado
Betty McKenna
Lenora Mandella
Naomi Meier
Norma Metrolis
Rita Meyer
Dorothy Mueller
Mary Nesbitt
Joanne Overleese
Marguerite Pearson
Marjorie Pieper
Rita Rehrer
Mary Reynolds
Georgiana Rios
Jenny Romatowski
Eilaine Roth
Elaine Roth
Mary Rountree
Gloria Ruiz
Margaret Russo
June Schofield
Twila Shively
Frances Sloan
Jean Smith 
Shirley Smith
Donna Stageman
Elma Steck
Jane Stoll
Dorothy Stolze
Beverly Stuhr
Betty Terry
Betty Tucker
Kathryn Vonderau 
Nancy Warren
Marion Watson
Margaret Wenzell
Ruth Williams
Dolores Wilson
Mary Wisham
Mary Wood

Managers

References
All-American Girls Professional Baseball League official website – Peoria Redwings seasons
All-American Girls Professional Baseball League Record Book – W. C. Madden. Publisher: McFarland & Company, 2000. Format: Hardcover, 294pp. Language: English. 

All-American Girls Professional Baseball League teams
1946 establishments in Illinois
1951 disestablishments in Illinois
Baseball teams established in 1946
Baseball teams disestablished in 1951
Professional baseball teams in Illinois
Redwings
Defunct baseball teams in Illinois
Women's sports in Illinois